Mission in Tangier (French: Mission à Tanger) is a 1949 French drama film directed by André Hunebelle and starring Raymond Rouleau, Gaby Sylvia and Mila Parély. It was the first in the trilogy of films featuring dashing reporter Georges Masse, and was followed in 1950 by Beware of Blondes. It was shot at the Billancourt Studios in Paris. The film's sets were designed by the art director Lucien Carré.

Plot
During the Second World War, Georges Masse undergoes a dangerous mission by taking secret documents from Tangiers to London.

Cast
 Raymond Rouleau as Georges Masse
 Gaby Sylvia as Lily
 Mila Parély as Barbara
 Henri Nassiet as Alexandre Segard
 Louis de Funès as a Spanish general officer
 Christian Bertola as Henri Pelletier
 Pierre Destailles as Maurin
 Jo Dest as Herr von Kloster
 Max Révol as the barkeeper
 Madeleine Barbulée as  the typist in the editorial department
 Billy Bourbon as the cabaret spectator
 Gregori Chmara as the Russian singer
 Monique Darbaud as von Kloster's female escort
 Gisèle François as La jeune vendeuse de fleurs du Cabaret
 Lucien Frégis as Un journaliste
 Louis de Funès as Le colonel espagnol
 Claude Garbe as La secrétaire de Segard
 Jacques Henley as Le colonel britannique au cabaret
 Jacqueline Huet as La dame du vestiaire au cabaret
 Nicole Jonesco as Une standardiste
 Véra Norman as La militaire dans l'avion
 Jean Richard as Le président
 Andrée Tainsy as La balayeuse du cabaret
 Gérard Séty as Un client du cabaret
 Van Doude as Un client du cabaret
 André Valmy as Beaudoit
 Bernard Lajarrige as 	P'tit Louis
 Nadine Tallier as Une jeune femme dans le cabaret

References

External links
 

1949 films
1949 drama films
1940s French-language films
Films directed by André Hunebelle
Films set in 1942
Films set in Tangier
Films about journalists
Films with screenplays by Michel Audiard
French black-and-white films
French drama films
Films shot at Billancourt Studios
1940s French films